Amy Walton may refer to:

 Amy and Emily Walton, child actress
 Amy Catherine Walton (1849–1939), English author